"Talk Too Much" is a song written and recorded by American rock band Coin, released as the lead single for their second studio album How Will You Know If You Never Try by Columbia Records.

Writing and composition
"Talk Too Much" was co-written by Chase Lawrence and Joe Memmel of the band, together with Tim Pagnotta, Christopher J Baran and Peter Thomas. The song was about Lawrence's inability to leave his thoughts unsaid, and was written in a few hours.

Music video
The music video for the song was released on September 21, 2016.

Chart performance 
"Talk Too Much" is Coin's first hit that debuted on two US category charts, peaking at No. 8 on the Alternative Songs chart and No. 28 on the Hot Rock Songs chart.

Charts

Certifications

References 

2016 singles
2016 songs
Columbia Records singles
Songs written by CJ Baran
Songs written by Tim Pagnotta
Coin (band) songs